Bert Erik Johan Robertsson (born June 30, 1974) is a Swedish former professional ice hockey defenceman and current head coach of Linköpings HC of the Swedish Hockey League (SHL). Robertsson played in the system of Södertälje SK in Sweden and was selected by the Vancouver Canucks in the 1993 NHL Entry Draft. Moving to North America in 1995, Robertsson played parts of four seasons in the National Hockey League (NHL) with the Canucks, Edmonton Oilers, and New York Rangers between 1997 and 2001, while mainly playing in the minor American Hockey League, before returning to Europe in 2002 and finishing his career there.

Playing career
While his natural position was on the blueline, Robertsson spent much of his NHL career on the wing. While he was lacking in puck skills and offensive ability, his work ethic, in-your-face style of play, and solid defensive instincts made him a useful utility player at the NHL level.

Robertsson made his professional debut with the Canucks' AHL affiliate, the Syracuse Crunch, in the 1995–96 season.  He made his NHL debut in the 1997–98 season with the Canucks, appearing in 30 games and recording 2 goals along with 4 assists. He spent most of the 1998–99 season on the Canucks' roster, appearing in 39 games and recording 2 goals and 4 points.

He moved to the Edmonton Oilers organization for the 1999–2000 season. With the Oilers, he appeared in a career-high 52 games - recording 4 assists - and also saw his first NHL playoff action, appearing in all five games of Edmonton's opening-round loss to the Dallas Stars. The Oilers left him unprotected in the 2000 NHL Expansion Draft, in which he was selected by the Columbus Blue Jackets.

After leaving Edmonton, Robertsson struggled to find a home in the NHL. In his final two seasons in North America, he moved through five NHL organizations (Columbus, the New York Rangers, the Nashville Predators, the Mighty Ducks of Anaheim, and the Pittsburgh Penguins) and six minor-pro teams. During this time he appeared in only two NHL games: in 2000–01 with the Rangers.

Robertsson would return to Europe for the 2002–03 season, joining Ilves of Finland's SM-liiga.  He then went home to Sweden, re-joining Södertälje SK of the Swedish Elite League in 2003. After two more seasons there, he retired in 2005.

He finished his NHL career with 4 goals and 10 assists in 123 career games, along with 75 penalty minutes.

Coaching career
Robertsson immediately transitioned to a coaching capacity, securing an assistant coaching role with Almtuna IS in the HockeyAllsvenskan. He later moved to top-tier club, Skellefteå AIK, initially as an assistant before securing the head coach role and claiming the Le Mat trophy in the 2012–13 season.

After two championships in his eight-year tenure coaching within Skellefteå AIK, Robertsson left the club to assume the head coaching role with Linköpings HC for the 2019–20 season. He was signed to a three-year contract on 10 April 2019.

Career statistics

Regular season and playoffs

References

External links

1974 births
Cincinnati Mighty Ducks players
Edmonton Oilers players
Hamilton Bulldogs (AHL) players
Hartford Wolf Pack players
Houston Aeros (1994–2013) players
Ilves players
Living people
Milwaukee Admirals players
Milwaukee Admirals (IHL) players
New York Rangers players
People from Södertälje
Södertälje SK players
Swedish ice hockey defencemen
Syracuse Crunch players
Vancouver Canucks draft picks
Vancouver Canucks players
Wilkes-Barre/Scranton Penguins players
Sportspeople from Stockholm County